Meital Dayan (born ) is an Israeli football defender.

Club career
Dayan had played in the Israeli First League since its inception in 1998, first with Maccabi Haifa and later with ASA Tel Aviv University and Maccabi Holon. During her club career, Dayan won 2 championship titles and  5 national cups and played in the UEFA Women's Champions League with Maccabi Haifa in 2002.

International career
Dayan played for the national team since 1998, appearing in 29 matches and scoring 4 goals.

Honours
Championships (2):
With Maccabi Haifa: 1998–99, 2001–02
Cup (5):
With Maccabi Haifa: 1998–99, 1999–2000, 2001–02
With Maccabi Holon: 2009–10, 2012–13

References

External links

1979 births
Israeli Jews
Living people
ASA Tel Aviv University players
Footballers from Kiryat Ata
Israel women's international footballers
Israeli women's footballers
Maccabi Be'er Sheva F.C. (women) players
Maccabi Haifa F.C. (women) players
Maccabi Holon F.C. (women) players
Women's association football forwards